C45 or C-45 may refer to:

 Beech C-45 Expeditor, an American military transport aircraft
 C4.5 algorithm, used to generate a decision tree
 C45 road (Namibia)
 Caldwell 45, a spiral galaxy
 Cannabis Act introduced as Bill C-45 to the Parliament of Canada
 EADS/Northrop Grumman KC-45, a cancelled air refueling aircraft for the US Air Force
 Scotch Game, a chess opening
 Underground Work (Women) Convention, 1935 of the International Labour Organization
 Ursus C-45, a Polish tractor
 C45, a variant of Claridge Hi-Tec/Goncz Pistol rifle
 C45, a 45-minute audio Compact Cassette tape
 C45 Scaphandre Autonome, vintage scuba equipment